John Tyrrell (17 August 1942 – 4 October 2018) was a British musicologist. He published several books on Leoš Janáček, including an authoritative and largely definitive two-volume biography. Tyrrell was born in Salisbury, Zimbabwe and worked as a professor of music and executive editor of The New Grove Dictionary of Music and Musicians. He died on October 4, 2018, aged 76.

Early life
Tyrrell was born in Salisbury, Southern Rhodesia (now Harare, Zimbabwe), he studied at the universities of Cape Town, Oxford and Brno. He graduated Bachelor of Music at the University of Cape Town following which he moved to the University of Oxford to pursue a doctoral degree under the supervision of Edmund Rubbra.

Career
Tyrrell started his career working in an editorial capacity at The Musical Times. He was a Lecturer in Music  at the University of Nottingham (1976), becoming Reader in Opera Studies (1987) and Professor (1996). From 1996 to 2000 he was Executive Editor of the second edition of The New Grove Dictionary of Music and Musicians (2001). From 2000-08, he was Research Professor at Cardiff University.

He received numerous awards and honours throughout his career. In 2002, he was awarded an honorary doctorate from the Masaryk University. Then again in 2012, he was awarded another honorary doctorate by the Janáček Academy of Performing Arts, situated in Janáček’s hometown of Brno. In 2018, he received the Classic Prague Award. Later that year, the Janáček Festival was also dedicated in his honour.

Death
He died on the morning of 4 October 2018 at the age of 76.

References

Further reading
 Cardiff University faculty profile

External links

1942 births
2018 deaths
Academics of Cardiff University
Academics of the University of Nottingham
English musicologists
Rhodesian emigrants to the United Kingdom
People from Harare